The Ford Iosis is a four-door, four-seat saloon concept car developed by Ford Europe. It first was shown to the public at the 2005 Frankfurt Motor Show. Along with the Ford SAV (shown earlier that year at the Geneva Auto Show), it was designed to showcase the dynamic new design, the Ford Kinetic Design, direction Ford intends to pursue for the European market.

The shape of the concept car has been said to resemble an Aston Martin, featuring clean angles, a sharply sloped windscreen and large wheels.

Iosis X
The following year at the 2006 Paris Motor Show Ford presented the Iosis X, an SUV concept sharing the Iosis design language, which eventually led to the Ford Kuga

Iosis-MAX

The Iosis-MAX is a concept car.

It is a vision for Ford's next generation compact multi-activity vehicle (MAV), and hints at the design direction of Ford's next global C-cars. It features the Ford Kinetic Design using lightweight materials and advanced aerodynamics. Key aerodynamic features were the rear door pillars, the rear wing design, and active front cooling ducts in the main trapezoidal grille which are blanked off when not needed.

The car was unveiled at the 2009 Geneva Auto Show to showcase the evolving states of Ford's Kinetic Design

See also
 Ford Kinetic Design

References

External links
Ford Media Press Release: iosis by Ford
Cars.com: Ford Iosis

Iosis
Sedans
Cars introduced in 2005